Ingeringsee is a lake of Steiermark, Austria. The lake is located at approximately 1200 meters above sea level and is situated among mountains.

References

Lakes of Styria
LIngeringsee